Anne Mary Teresa Fitzalan-Howard, Duchess of Norfolk,  (née Constable-Maxwell; 30 August 1927 – 8 April 2013) was a British peeress and humanitarian.

Early life and family
Fitzalan-Howard was the eldest daughter of Wing Commander Gerald Maxwell, a Knight of Malta and Papal Chamberlain, and his American wife, Caroline Burns Carden. During the Blitz, she and her sisters were sent to the United States, spending most of the war years living with an aunt in New Jersey.

Marriage
On 4 July 1949, she married Hon. Miles Fitzalan-Howard, the eldest son of Bernard Fitzalan-Howard, 3rd Baron Howard of Glossop, and his wife, Mona. They had five children, two sons and three daughters.

In 1971, her husband inherited the barony of Beaumont from his mother, making her Lady Beaumont. In 1972, her husband inherited his father's barony. She continued to be known as Lady Beaumont, as the Beaumont barony was the senior of the two baronies. He inherited his cousin's dukedom of Norfolk in 1975 and she became the Duchess of Norfolk. In 1992, the duchess was appointed CBE for her work as founder and co-chair of Help the Hospices.

Ancestry

References

1927 births
2013 deaths
Anne
British Roman Catholics
British humanitarians
British people of American descent
Commanders of the Order of the British Empire
Place of birth missing
Place of death missing
Wives of knights